Ján Marcin (born 7 September 1985) is a Slovak football defender who currently plays for ŠK 1923 Gabčíkovo.

References

External links
 
 Eurofotbal profile
  at fcdac1904.com

1985 births
Living people
Slovak footballers
Association football defenders
MFK Zemplín Michalovce players
FC Senec players
FC DAC 1904 Dunajská Streda players
Slovak Super Liga players
Jan Marcin
Expatriate footballers in Thailand
Syrianska IF Kerburan players
Expatriate footballers in Sweden